Karena Evans (born December 17, 1995) is a Canadian director and actress. She garnered recognition for directing the music videos for Drake's 2018 Billboard Hot 100 chart-topping singles, "God's Plan", "Nice for What", and "In My Feelings". Evans won the 2018 Much Music Video Award for Best Director and became the first woman to receive the Prism Prize's Lipsett Award for music video direction.

Evans has acted in the television series Mary Kills People and had a starring role in the 2018 indie film Firecrackers, which premiered at the 2018 Toronto International Film Festival. In 2020, Evans directed the premiere episode for the Starz drama series P-Valley. She directed an episode of the fourth season of the FX crime drama Snowfall, and she directed the first two episodes of the HBO Max Gossip Girl reboot.

Career

Directing 
Evans began her career in the music industry as an intern for Director X. She was eventually signed as a director to his music video production company, Popprok. Since then, Evans has directed music videos for numerous artists, including Belly and Sean Paul. She has also directed commercials for Nike, Inc., including a Black Lives Matter short for the brand.

Evans garnered attention in early 2018 when she directed the music video for Drake's single "God's Plan"; the video went viral and the song reached number one on the Billboard Hot 100. The video depicts Drake donating his $1 million production budget to the people of Miami. Evans subsequently directed his "Nice for What" music video, which garnered critical acclaim from several publications. Evans referred to the video as a "celebration of women", as the video featured iconic female stars such as Olivia Wilde and Issa Rae. Vogue lauded Evans as "surely destined to be the starriest young video director in the firmament". Later that year, she became the first woman to win the Prism Prize's Lipsett Award for music video direction. That year, Director X posted a congratulations to Evans with this caption:"@karenaevans started as an intern. She stayed longer worked harder than everyone else. From intern to director at my company. Last year grinding on low budget jobs giving big budget results. This year she’s directed @champagnepapi God’s Plan & the new single Nice For What. When work ethic is matched by talent. Big up the team @popp_rok for pulling this wide ranging job off. Here’s some bts footage for all y’all 🙌🏽 (feel like a Dad video taping his daughter at a recital when ever I come to set)"In May 2018, SZA released a music video featuring Donald Glover for her song "Garden (Say It Like That)", which was directed by Evans. Evans signed with WME later that month. That summer, she also directed the music videos for Drake's singles "I'm Upset" and "In My Feelings".

In late 2018, Evans earned Much Music Video Award and MTV Video Music Award nominations for her work on Drake's videos. She ultimately won Best Director at the 2018 iHeartRadio MMVAs for her work on "God's Plan". In 2020, Evans was placed on BET's "Future 40" list, which is a list of “40 of the most inspiring and innovative vanguards who are redefining what it means to be unapologetically young, gifted, and black”.

Acting 
As an actress, Evans began her career in 2016 with a role in a short film called WhiteWoods. In 2018, she starred in two feature films, Michael Sucsy's Every Day and Jasmin Mozaffari's Firecrackers, opposite Michaela Kurimsky, the latter of which premiered at the 2018 Toronto International Film Festival. That same year, she also performed a recurring role in the Canadian television series Mary Kills People.

Influences 
Evans is the younger sister of Jordan Evans, a producer who has worked with several successful artists, and was inspired by him to pursue her passion. Evans has stated that she is heavily influenced by Melina Matsoukas, whom she called her "hero" in an interview with Billboard. Evans hopes to be an inspiration for other young black women from her hometown of Toronto.

Filmography

Film

TV

Music videos

References

External links

1995 births
Living people
Canadian music video directors
21st-century Canadian actresses
Actresses from Toronto
Canadian film actresses
Canadian television actresses
Black Canadian writers
Black Canadian actresses
Writers from Toronto